This article lists events that occurred during 2008 in Estonia.

Incumbents
President – Toomas Hendrik Ilves 
Prime Minister – Andrus Ansip

Events
28 June – Estonian United Left Party was established.
10 November – ETV2 was launched.

Births

Deaths

See also
 2008 in Estonian football
 2008 in Estonian television

References

 
2000s in Estonia
Estonia
Estonia
Years of the 21st century in Estonia